Antônio Carlos Bernardes Gomes (April 7, 1941 in Rio de Janeiro – July 29, 1994 in São Paulo), known artistically as Carlinhos Mussum or simply Mussum, was a famous Brazilian actor and musician, notable for being a member of the comedic group Os Trapalhões. He was also member of the musical group Os Originais do Samba (The Originals of Samba).

He died due to complications after a heart transplant in 1994.

Television
Bairro Feliz (TV Globo, 1965)
Os Trapalhões (TV Excelsior, 1969)
Os Trapalhões (TV Tupi, 1974—1976)
Os Trapalhões (TV Globo, 1977—1993)
Criança Esperança (TV Globo, 1986–1993)

Filmography

with Os Trapalhões
1976: Trapalhão no Planalto dos Macacos as Guarda Azevedo
1976: O Trapalhão nas Minas do Rei Salomão as Fumaça
1978: Os Trapalhões na Guerra dos Planetas as himself
1979: Rei e os Trapalhões as Abol
1979: O Cinderelo Trapalhão as himself
1980: Os Três Mosqueteiros Trapalhões as himself
1980: O Incrível Monstro Trapalhão
1981: Os Saltimbancos Trapalhões as himself
1981: O Mundo Mágico dos Trapalhões
1982: Os Vagabundos Trapalhões
1983: Os Trapalhões na Serra Pelada as Mexelete
1983: O Cangaceiro Trapalhão
1983: Atrapalhando a Suate
1984: Os Trapalhões e o Mágico de Oróz as Tin Can Man
1984: A Filha dos Trapalhões as himself
1985: Os Trapalhões no Reino da Fantasia as himself
1986: Os Trapalhões no Rabo do Cometa
1986: Os Trapalhões e o Rei do Futebol as Fumê
1987: Os Trapalhões no Auto da Compadecida as himself
1987: Os Fantasmas Trapalhões as himself
1988: Os Heróis Trapalhões - Uma Aventura na Selva as himself
1988: O Casamento dos Trapalhões
1989: A Princesa Xuxa e os Trapalhões as Mussaim
1989: Os Trapalhões na Terra dos Monstros as himself
1990: Uma Escola Atrapalhada as Mumu, o Mago
1990: O Mistério de Robin Hood as Tonho
1991: Os Trapalhões e a Árvore da Juventude as himself (final film role)

External links

 circus performers Mussum

1941 births
1994 deaths
Brazilian male television actors
Brazilian male comedians
Afro-Brazilian people
Os Trapalhões
Samba musicians
20th-century Brazilian male actors
20th-century comedians